Edgar Garcia may refer to:
Edgar García (mixed martial artist)
Edgar García (bullfighter)
Édgar García (baseball, born 1987)
Édgar García (baseball, born 1996)

See also
Ed Garcia (disambiguation)